Rtishchevo is the name of several inhabited localities in Russia.

Urban localities
Rtishchevo, a town  in Saratov Oblast; administratively incorporated as a town of oblast significance

Rural localities
Rtishchevo, Moscow Oblast, a village under the administrative jurisdiction of Domodedovo Town Under Oblast Jurisdiction, Moscow Oblast
Rtishchevo, Novoderevenkovsky District, Oryol Oblast, a village in Starogolsky Selsoviet of Novoderevenkovsky District of Oryol Oblast
Rtishchevo, Verkhovsky District, Oryol Oblast, a selo in Russko-Brodsky Selsoviet of Verkhovsky District of Oryol Oblast
Rtishchevo, Penza Oblast, a selo in Bolshelukinsky Selsoviet of Vadinsky District of Penza Oblast
Rtishchevo, Yaroslavl Oblast, a village in Slobodskoy Rural Okrug of Danilovsky District of Yaroslavl Oblast